Lintneria maura is a moth of the  family Sphingidae.

Distribution 
It is known from Argentina and Bolivia.

Description 
The wingspan is about 80 mm. 
There are orange-yellow transverse median lines on the abdomen upperside.

Biology 
Adults have been recorded from May to October in Bolivia and from November to December in Argentina.Adults have been recorded in late January in Brazil.

The larvae probably feed on Lamiaceae (such as Salvia, Mentha, Monarda and Hyptis), Hydrophylloideae (such as Wigandia) and Verbenaceae species (such as Verbena and Lantana).

References

Lintneria
Moths described in 1879